Adrian Robinson (born 11 April 2000) is a Botswana swimmer. He competed in the men's 50 metre breaststroke event at the 2017 World Aquatics Championships. In 2019, he represented Botswana at the 2019 African Games held in Rabat, Morocco.

References

External links
 

2000 births
Living people
Botswana male swimmers
Place of birth missing (living people)
Swimmers at the 2019 African Games
Male breaststroke swimmers
African Games competitors for Botswana
Swimmers at the 2022 Commonwealth Games
Commonwealth Games competitors for Botswana